Peter Glotz (6 March 1939 – 25 August 2005) was a German social democratic politician (Social Democratic Party) and social scientist.

Peter Glotz was born in Cheb, Czechoslovakia, to a German father and a Czech mother. His father, an insurance-clerk joined the Nazi Party and administered a small "aryanized" Jewish factory in Prague. His family was expelled from Czechoslovakia in September 1945 and settled in Franconia. He studied Journalism, Philosophy, Germanistics, and Sociology at the Ludwig Maximilian University of Munich and the University of Vienna, and became a doctor of philosophy in 1968.

Glotz became director of the Ludwig Maximilian University in 1969 and a member of the Landtag of Bavaria in 1970. He was a member of the German parliament from 1972 to 1977 and a parliamentary state secretary of the Federal Minister for Education and Research from 1974 until 1977.

From 1977 to 1981 Glotz was a senator for science and research in the state of Berlin, and became a member of the parliament again in 1983, resigning in 1996. He was secretary general of the SPD from 1981 to 1987. Glotz then became founding director of the University of Erfurt (1996–1999) and professor for communication sciences.

From January 2000 until his death in Zürich, Glotz was a Professor for media and society at the University of St. Gallen in Switzerland. In 2002, he was a representative of the German Chancellor to the European Convention. With Erika Steinbach, he was chairman of the Centre Against Expulsions foundation.

Selected works
 Der Weg der Sozialdemokratie – the author takes on the ardent young socialists in his constituency
 Die deutsche Rechte, Eine Streitschrift, DVA
 Der Irrweg des Nationalstaats. Europäische Reden an ein deutsches Publikum, DVA
 Manifest für eine Neue Europäische Linke, Wolf Jost Siedler Verlag, Berlin 1985 – Manifesto for a new European left
 “Democracy? The Threatened Utopia: An Interview with Norberto Bobbio”. Telos 82 (Winter 1989–90). New York: Telos Press.
 Die Linke nach dem Sieg des Westens, DVA 1992
 Die beschleunigte Gesellschaft: Kulturkämpfe im digitalen Kapitalismus, Kindler 1999
 Von Analog nach Digital: Unsere Gesellschaft auf dem Weg zur digitalen Kultur, Huber 2000
 Ron Sommer: Der Weg der Telekom, Hoffmann und Campe 2001
 Die Vertreibung – Böhmen als Lehrstück, Ullstein 2003

References

External links
 

1939 births
2005 deaths
People from Cheb
Senators of Berlin
Members of the Bundestag for Bavaria
Members of the Bundestag for the Social Democratic Party of Germany
Members of the Bundestag 1994–1998
Members of the Bundestag 1990–1994
Members of the Bundestag 1987–1990
Members of the Bundestag 1983–1987
Members of the Bundestag 1976–1980
Members of the Bundestag 1972–1976
People from Sudetenland
Commanders Crosses of the Order of Merit of the Federal Republic of Germany
Academic staff of the University of St. Gallen
Sudeten German people